Roy L. McCulty (1889–1968) was an American World War I combat veteran, a Roane County, West Virginia businessman, a six term Republican member of the West Virginia House of Delegates from 1942 to 1954, and a Republican member of the West Virginia Senate, representing its 4th district from 1957 to 1960.

References

1889 births
1968 deaths
People from Roane County, West Virginia
Republican Party members of the West Virginia House of Delegates
Republican Party West Virginia state senators
20th-century American politicians
People from Spencer, West Virginia